The Mexia News is an afternoon newspaper published in Mexia, Texas. In January 2009 it changed its name from The Mexia Daily News and converted its publication schedule from five days a week to three.  It is owned by Community Newspaper Holdings Inc.

References

External links
 Mexia News Website
 CNHI Website

Mexia Daily News
Mexia Daily News